While also using the international geologic time scale, many nations–especially those with isolated and therefore non-standard prehistories–use their own systems of dividing geologic time into epochs and faunal stages. 

In New Zealand, these epochs and stages use local place names (mainly Māori in origin) back to the Permian.  Prior to this time, names mostly align to those in the Australian geologic time scale, and are not divided into epochs. In practice, these earlier terms are rarely used, as most New Zealand geology is of a more recent origin. In all cases, New Zealand uses the same periods as those used internationally; the renaming only applies to subdivisions of these periods. Very few epochs and stages cross international period boundaries, and the exceptions are almost all within the Cenozoic Era. New Zealand updates will always be behind any significant international updates in the International Geological Time Scale.

Although the New Zealand geologic time scale has not been formally adopted, it has been widely used by earth scientists, geologists and palaeontologists in New Zealand since J. S. Crampton proposed it in 1995. The most recent calibrated update was in 2015. 

A standard abbreviation is used for these epochs and stages. These are usually in the form Xx, where the first letter is the initial letter of the epoch and the second (lower-case) letter is the initial letter of the stage. These are noted beside the stage names in the list below.

Currently, from the New Zealand perspective we are in the Haweran stage of the Wanganui epoch which is within the internationally defined Holocene epoch  of the Quaternary  period of the Cenozoic era. The Haweran, which started some 340,000 years ago, is named after the North Island town of Hawera. The New Zealand stages and epochs are not the same as internationally defined periods and epochs (e.g. the Wanganui epoch started at 5.33 Ma which is within the Neogene period and matches the start of the international Pliocene epoch, but contains also the international Holocene and Pleistocene epochs).

List of New Zealand geologic time epochs and stages
Times given indicate the start of the respective stages and epochs. Several of these stages are further divided into upper and lower or upper, middle, and lower, although this has not been noted below unless unique names have been given to these sub-stages. As with the international geologic scale, these epochs and stages are largely named for locales where rock dating from these time periods is in evidence, with stage names predominantly but not always named for locales close to their epoch's namesake site. Where known, these places are also linked in the list below.

Cenozoic Era

Mesozoic Era

Cretaceous Period

Jurassic Period

Triassic Period

Palaeozoic Era

Permian Period

Carboniferous Period

Devonian Period
Stages prior to the beginning of the Carboniferous Period use either international (Devonian/Silurian) or Australian (Ordovician/Cambrian) geologic stage names; very little New Zealand rock is known from these geologic periods.

Silurian Period

Ordovician Period

Cambrian Period

Proterozoic, Archaean and Hadaean Aeons
{| class="wikitable"
|width="250pt"|Name
|width="50pt"|Abbreviation
|width="100pt"|Start date (Ma)
|-style="background:#bbcccc;"
|(Not subdivided)
|Z
|~4600
|}

Footnotes to time scale
  This stage is sometimes further divided into Mangaoran (lower) and Waikatoan (upper). These are named after Mangaora Inlet (an arm of Kawhia Harbour) and the Waikato River.
   This stage is sometimes further divided into Kiriteherean (lower) and Marokopan (upper). These are named after the Marokopa River and the nearby Kiritehere Stream.
  Until the late 1960s, the Flettian and Barettian stages were together known as the Braxtonian stage (see Waterhouse 1969). This was named for Braxton Burn, a stream near Mossburn.
 Where not subdivided usual reason is no stages recognised due to absent record 

See also
Stratigraphy of New Zealand

References

Other References
Bishop, D.G., and Turnbull, I.M. (compilers) (1996). Geology of the Dunedin Area. Lower Hutt, NZ: Institute of Geological & Nuclear Sciences. .
Hollis, C.J., Beu, A.G., Crampton, J.S., Crundwell, M.P., Morgans, H.E.G., Raine, J.I., Jones, C.M., Boyes, A.F. (2010). Calibration of the New Zealand Cretaceous - Cenozoic Timescale to GTS2004, GNS Science Report, 2010/43, 20p.
Waterhouse, J.B. (1969). "World correlations of New Zealand Permian stages," New Zealand Journal of Geology and Geophysics,'' 12:4, pp. 713–737

External links

Paleozoic Oceania
Mesozoic Oceania
Cenozoic Oceania
Regional geologic time scales
Stratigraphy